Steroidobacter  is a genus of bacteria from the family of Steroidobacteraceae.

References

Further reading 
 

Gammaproteobacteria
Bacteria genera